Kris Peeters (born 18 May 1962) is a Belgian politician of the Christian Democratic and Flemish who has been serving as vice-president of the European Investment Bank (EIB) since 2021. Earlier in his career, he was Minister-President of Flanders (2007–2014), Deputy Prime Minister and Minister of Economy and Employment in the government of Prime Minister Charles Michel (2014–2019), and a Member of the European Parliament (2019–2021).

Early life and education 

After attending secondary school in Boom, Peeters studied law in Antwerp and obtained a law degree in 1986. In addition, he obtained a degree in taxation and accounting from Vlerick Business School in Ghent.

Early career 
Peeters served from 1991 to 1994 as Director of the NCMV research department. In 1994, he became Secretary-General of NCMV and when NCMV was reformed into the SME interest group UNIZO in 1999, he became its first managing director.

Political career

Career in national politics 
In 2004, although not having been a candidate for public office at the 2004 regional elections, Peeters was asked to become a member of the Flemish Government. He resigned his position with UNIZO and became Flemish Minister for Public Works, Energy, the Environment and Nature.

During the 2006 municipal elections, Peeters ran for public office the first time in his career and was elected a member of the city council of his home town Puurs. In the 2007 Belgian federal elections, Peeters was elected to the Belgian Chamber of Representatives but chose not to take his seat, instead he succeeded Yves Leterme as Minister-President of Flanders, as Leterme headed the CD&V coalition talks for a new Belgian government. Peeters also gave up his former competences to Hilde Crevits and took on the responsibilities for Institutional Affairs, Agriculture and Sea Fisheries, formerly belonging to Leterme, while keeping his own competence regarding Ports. He has been serving a second term as head of the Flemish government since the regional elections of 7 June 2009, with the additional competences of Institutional Affairs, Economy, Agriculture and Sea Fisheries.

During the 2014 Belgian government formation Peeters was co-formateur along with Charles Michel (MR). Peeters was poised to become the new Prime Minister of Belgium. However, upon nominating Marianne Thyssen (also CD&V) as European Commissioner, his party already held a major political office. Consequently, Charles Michel became Prime Minister, and Kris Peeters became Deputy Prime Minister and Minister of Employment, Economy and Consumer Affairs in the Michel Government.

Besides Bart De Wever, Maggie De Block and Theo Francken, Peeters is one of the most popular political figures in Flanders in recent years.

Member of the European Parliament, 2019–2021
Peeters was a Member of the European Parliament from 2019 until 2021. During that time, he served on the Committee on the Internal Market and Consumer Protection and the Subcommittee on Security and Defence. In addition to his committee assignments, he chaired the Parliament's delegation for relations with the NATO Parliamentary Assembly.

Later career 
In late 2020, Peeters was nominated by the government of Prime Minister Alexander De Croo to become one of the vice-presidents of the European Investment Bank (EIB), representing the Benelux countries. In this capacity, he oversees the Bank's activities on files such as mobility, security and defence, as well as operations in the ASEAN countries.

References

External links 
 
 
 Kris Peeters on the website of CD&V

1962 births
Christian Democratic and Flemish politicians
Flemish politicians
Living people
Ministers-President of Flanders
21st-century Belgian politicians
Vlerick Business School alumni
MEPs for Belgium 2019–2024